Howard Andre Lowe (born 14 July 1979) is a Guyanese former professional footballer who played as a defender. He formerly captained the Guyana national team, for which made 46 appearances and scored one goal.

International career 
Lowe made 46 appearances for the Guyana national team between 2002 and 2010. He scored one goal in 2007.

International goals 

 Guyana score listed first, score column indicates score after the Lowe goal.

Honours 
North East Stars

 TT Pro League: 2004

Caledonia AIA

 Trinidad and Tobago FA Trophy: 2008

Alpha United

 GFF National Super League: 2009, 2010, 2011–12, 2012–13, 2013–14

References

External links 

 
 

1979 births
Living people
People from Linden, Guyana

Guyanese footballers
Association football defenders
North East Stars F.C. players
Morvant Caledonia United players
Alpha United FC players
TT Pro League players
Guyana international footballers
Guyanese expatriate footballers
Expatriate footballers in Trinidad and Tobago
Guyanese expatriate sportspeople in Trinidad and Tobago